Prader-Willi/Angelman region-1, also known as PWAR1, is an exon of the lncRNA Small nucleolar RNA host gene 14 (SNHG14).

References

Further reading